Bertrand LeBlanc is a Canadian politician, who was elected to the Legislative Assembly of New Brunswick in the 2010 provincial election. He represented the electoral district of Rogersville-Kouchibouguac from 2010 to 2014, and the redistributed district of Kent North from 2014 to 2018, as a member of the Liberals.

References

New Brunswick Liberal Association MLAs
Acadian people
Living people
21st-century Canadian politicians
Year of birth missing (living people)